Paul Nathaniel Miranda (born May 2, 1976) is a former American football cornerback in the National Football League. He was drafted by the Indianapolis Colts in the fourth round of the 1999 NFL Draft and also played for the Seattle Seahawks and Miami Dolphins. He played college football for the UCF Knights.

References

1976 births
Living people
People from Thomasville, Georgia
Players of American football from Georgia (U.S. state)
American football cornerbacks
Holmes Bulldogs football players
UCF Knights football players
Indianapolis Colts players
Seattle Seahawks players